Nirmala Higher Secondary School is an English medium recognised unaided high school for boys and girls (Std. V-XII) following the Kerala syllabus and preparing the students for the SSLC and Higher Secondary Examinations. It is owned and managed by the Diocese of Kothamangalam and is located in Muvattupuzha, Ernakulam, Kerala in India.

History

The school was started on August, 7 1961 with the blessings of late Mar Mathew Pothanamuzhi, first Bishop of Kothamangalam, the patronage of late Sri. K.M. George former Minister, Govt. of Kerala, and the stewardship of Rev. Fr. George Kunnamkot, former headmaster. It is a residential school with a separate boarding house for boys and girls.

Admission is open to all pupils without any distinction of caste or creed.

Facilities
A school bus provides transportation for students. There are also boarding options, with some faculty staying with the students for safety.

Nirmala Higher Secondary School has two basketball courts.

Activities

Vidya Rangam Kala Sahitya Vedi
The aim of the club is to find  out the talents of children in literature and arts and train them with workshops, screen play writing, film production, story writing, drawing etc.

NCC
National Cadet Corps is a tri-services organisation comprising the Army, Navy and Air Force, engaged in grooming the youth – ‘The Leaders of Tomorrow’ – into disciplined and patriotic citizens. The genesis of the NCC can be traced back to the First World War when the Britishers created the University Corps as the second line of defense and to have a large pool of trained youth available for employment into the Armed Forces.

After independence the present day NCC under the Ministry of Defence came into existence on 16 Apr 1948 through NCC act XXXI, 1948. NCC was formally inaugurated on 15 Jul 1948.

In 1973 NCC is starting functioning in the school under 18(k)bn battalion. Parade training is twice in a week. The NCC cadets attend one 10-day camp, and a trekking camp and planting trees to teach them to protect nature. More than 100 students are eligible to get "C" certificates in each year.

Other clubs
There is also a Nature Club, Road Safety Club, Scouts and Guides clubs, Roller Skating Club, Dramatic Club and Yoga activities.

Athletics
The school Jaguars have sports teams including:
Football (Boys Senior and Boys Junior)
Basketball (Senior and Junior)
Volleyball (Senior, Junior and Boys )
Cricket (Varsity)
Track and Field (Senior and Junior)
Baseball (Boys)
Badminton (Senior and Junior).

References

Schools in Ernakulam district
Colleges affiliated to Mahatma Gandhi University, Kerala
Catholic universities and colleges in India
High schools and secondary schools in Kerala